Abraham Darío Carreño Rohan (born 13 January 1988) is a Mexican professional footballer who last played as a forward for Liga Nacional club Nueva Concepción.

Club career

CF Monterrey
Carreño started playing professionally in C.F. Monterrey, and made his league debut in August 2008 at 20 years old, in a tie with Atlas in Guadalajara, Jalisco. He eventually became a very important player for Monterrey. He earned his nickname of "El Amuleto" (The Amulet) due to a long streak of subbing into the match and scoring important goals. He is bound to gain minutes with Monterrey and is a national team strong prospect.

In the season Clausura 2009, Carreño became a very important substitute in club Monterrey's line up. He scored his first ever professional goal in a match against club Indios de Ciudad Juárez, he ended up scoring a total of 5 goals in that season. In Carreño's next season Apertura 2009, Monterrey won the championship for the third time, Carreño scored 4 goals in this season but scored a crucial goal in the semifinal's against Toluca which ended up making the game a 1–1 draw, but 3-1 global score, sending Moterrey to the final, to beat Cruz Azul for the championship. In the next season Bicentenario 2010 Carreño became the top scorer of Monterrey with 7 goals, and an important starter taking the place of Chilean striker Humberto Suazo. Monterrey ended the season in first place with a great record of 10 wins, 6 ties, and 1 loss. but lost in the quarterfinals against Pachuca. Although Carreño could not lead Monterrey to the semifinals, He was still very important through the whole season, and can be a very important player in there line up, for the upcoming season.

Honours
Monterrey
Mexican Primera División: Apertura 2009, Apertura 2010
CONCACAF Champions League: 2010-11, 2011–12
InterLiga: 2010

References

External links

1988 births
Living people
Sportspeople from Monterrey
Footballers from Nuevo León
Association football forwards
C.F. Monterrey players
C.F. Pachuca players
Tigres UANL footballers
Chiapas F.C. footballers
Cafetaleros de Chiapas footballers
Club Puebla players
Comunicaciones F.C. players
Venados F.C. players
Liga Nacional de Fútbol de Guatemala players
Liga MX players
Ascenso MX players
Expatriate footballers in Guatemala
Mexican footballers